Suhaylah Abd-Jaafar (born 1964) is an Iraqi lawyer and human rights activist. She was appointed Minister of displacement and migration in Ibrahim al Jaafari's Iraqi Transitional Government (2005–06). She survived a car bomb attack in February 2006. Variations of her name include Suhaila Abd-Jaafar and Suhayla Abd-Jaafar.

Early life
Abd-Jaafar belongs to one of Shi'ite Feyli Kurds tribes. She was born in Baghdad in 1964 and attended the University of Baghdad, from where she received her two degrees in Law and Politics in 1987.

Career
After finishing her education, Abd-Jaafar pursued a career in law and was also involved in human rights activities. As a lawyer, she has worked for both the Iraqi government and private clients. In May 2005, she was appointed the cabinet minister for displacement and migration in the Iraqi Transitional Government under the prime ministership of Ibrahim al Jaafari. She was succeeded by Abdul Samad Rahman Sultan, another Feyli Kurd.

In February 2006, while moving through eastern Baghdad, Abd-Jaafar's convoy struck a roadside bomb and three of her bodyguards were injured in the resulting explosion.

References

1964 births
Living people
21st-century Iraqi women politicians
21st-century Iraqi politicians
21st-century Kurdish women politicians
People from Baghdad
University of Baghdad alumni
20th-century Iraqi lawyers
Iraqi human rights activists
Government ministers of Iraq
21st-century Iraqi lawyers
Iraqi women lawyers